This is a list of the Yugoslavia national football team games between 1946 and 1969.

Federal People's Republic of  Yugoslavia

1946

1947

1948

1949

1950

1951

1952

1953

1954

1955

1956

1957

1958

1959

1960

1961

1962

1963

Socialist Federal Republic of Yugoslavia

1964

1965

1966

1967

1968

1969

See also
Yugoslavia national football team results (1920–41)
Yugoslavia national football team results (1970–92)
Croatia national football team results
Serbia national football team results

External links
Results at RSSSF 

Yugoslavia national football team results